The Lakshmipur Polytechnic Institute in Lakshmipur, Bangladesh, was established in 2006. It is located near Lakshmipur Stadium baishmara. It is under BTEB (Bangladesh Technical Education Board). It contains about 5,000 students.

See also 
 Dhaka Polytechnic Institute

References 

Universities and colleges in Lakshmipur District
Polytechnic institutes in Bangladesh
2006 establishments in Bangladesh
Educational institutions established in 2006